Aquilas Levi Houapeu (born June 22, 1989 in Abidjan, Cote d'Ivoire) is an Ivorian footballer who currently plays for Maryland Bobcats FC in the National Independent Soccer Association.

College and amateur soccer
Houapeu attended University of Maryland, Baltimore County between 2007 and 2010.
During his college years Houapeu also played for Reading United AC in the USL Premier Development League.

Professional career
Houapeu was drafted in the third round (41st overall) of the 2011 MLS SuperDraft by Philadelphia Union. Houpeau's season ended with a serious injury in September, 2011 and he was released by the club at the end of the season.

He spent 2013 with MISL club Baltimore Blast, before signing with USL Pro club Rochester Rhinos on May 9, 2014.

References

External links
 

1989 births
Living people
Ivorian footballers
Ivorian expatriate footballers
UMBC Retrievers men's soccer players
Reading United A.C. players
Philadelphia Union players
Baltimore Blast players
Rochester New York FC players
Christos FC players
Association football forwards
Expatriate soccer players in the United States
Philadelphia Union draft picks
USL League Two players
USL Championship players
Maryland Major Soccer League players
Footballers from Abidjan
Major Arena Soccer League players
Major Indoor Soccer League (2008–2014) players
Expatriate footballers in Wales
Ivorian expatriate sportspeople in Wales
United Premier Soccer League players